Josephine "Mother" Wade-Smith is an American chef and restaurateur. Wade opened Captain's Hard Times in Chatham neighborhood in Chicago in 1986, along with her partner. Wade created the recipes, many of which were based on family recipes for the soul food menu. The restaurant she founded is now named Josephine's Cooking and was featured on Restaurant: Impossible in 2019. A street in Chicago was named after her in 2017.

Biography 
Born in Forrest City, Arkansas, U.S., Wade grew up in poverty and her parents worked as sharecroppers. She graduated high school in Phoenix, Arizona, U.S.

In 1986, Wade and her husband, Rupert Smith, opened a restaurant called "Captain's Hard Times" in the Chatham neighborhood. The original idea was to name the restaurant "Josephine's," but she decided on a vacation to name the restaurant "hard times" instead after seeing the phrase printed on a matchbook. Captain was her partner's nickname. The restaurant featured "bayou decor" and Wade, the owner, served soul food. Wade created the recipes used in the restaurant, some of which were based on her own mother's recipes. Later, the restaurant was renamed to "Josephine's Cooking."

In addition to working in the restaurant, Wade is the head of a group, We Women Empowered, which works with young people. Wade also hired teenagers from the community to work in the restaurant. She also helped provide food and clothes for young people in the neighborhood. Wade also earned money as a mortgage broker. She worked to help elect Harold Washington as Mayor.

In 2017, Wade was honored by the city of Chicago in having a road named after her called "Mother Josephine Wade Way." The designation was presented on March 4 by Mayor Rahm Emanuel and the deputy mayor, Andrea Zopp. Wade and her restaurant were featured on Restaurant: Impossible in 2019.

References

External links 
 Josephine's Cooking Website
 A Special Tribute to Honor Chicago History Makers With Josephine Wade (2013 video)

Living people
1942 births
African-American activists
African-American chefs
American nonprofit chief executives
American women restaurateurs
American restaurateurs
American women chefs
Businesspeople from Chicago
Chefs from Illinois
People from Forrest City, Arkansas
Women nonprofit executives
21st-century African-American people
21st-century African-American women
20th-century African-American people
20th-century African-American women